Rodin Younessi (born August 1, 1969 in Palm Beach, Florida) is an American racing driver from Palm Beach, Florida.

Racing career
Younessi began racing motorcycles at a young age and also competed in sports car racing. In 2011 he competed in the U.S. F2000 National Championship for Pabst Racing Services and JDC Motorsports in the series' National Class. He made seven starts finishing the season Fourth (4th) in championship standing in the National Class with a best finish of 12th overall in race 2 at Road America. In 2011 he also competed in the pair of F2000 Championship Series races at the Mid-Ohio Sports Car Course. In 2012 Younessi formed his own team to compete in the Firestone Indy Lights series and announced that he would compete in the full season. However, Younessi ultimately only made two race starts, at the season opener in St. Petersburg and in June in Detroit. He finished 21st in points. He also competed in Baltimore driving a Le Mans Prototype Challenge Car in the American Le Mans Series.

In 2013 Younessi is competing in the Blancpain Endurance Series in a McLaren MP4-12C. In the first race of the season in Monza, Younessi set the fastest lap time in the second qualifying in a field of sixty cars. In May 2013 it was announced that Younessi would compete in the 2013 24 Hours of Le Mans. His team's Nissan powered Oreca 03 finished in 32nd place, 11th in the LMP2 class.

Personal
Younessi began his professional career in the software industry after receiving degrees in Computer Science and Electrical Engineering. He continued his education by attending law school. After receiving his Juris Doctor he was admitted as a member of the Florida and Federal Bar. In 2006, Younessi was knighted and received the title of Chevalier by the Order of St. John of Jerusalem, Knights Hospitaller for his various charitable activities and contributions. Pursuing his passion for MotorSports he switched professions by owning and operating motorsports dealerships, including some of the highest volume Harley-Davidson dealerships in America, San Diego Harley-Davidson, Los Angeles Harley-Davidson, Top Rocker Harley-Davidson, Seminole Harley-Davidson, Falcons Fury Harley-Davidson, Raging Bull Harley-Davidson, Miracle City Harley-Davidson, Mulholland Harley-Davidson, Treasure Coast Harley-Davidson, and Space Coast Harley-Davidson. He also owns a Lamborghini dealership in Palm Beach.

Younessi has one child a son named Dariyan Rodin Younessi who started his racing career at the age of four with Karting. He is married Mehrnoush Younessi.

Racing record

Complete U.S. F2000 National Championship results
(key)

American open–wheel racing results 
(key)

Indy Lights

Complete American Le Mans Series results

Blancpain Endurance Series

24 Hours of Le Mans

References

External links
Rodin Younessi Firestone Indy Lights Driver Profile

1969 births
Living people
American automobile salespeople
Sportspeople from Palm Beach, Florida
Racing drivers from Florida
Racing drivers from Miami
24 Hours of Le Mans drivers
FIA World Endurance Championship drivers
Blancpain Endurance Series drivers
Indy Lights drivers
U.S. F2000 National Championship drivers
JDC Motorsports drivers
Boutsen Ginion Racing drivers